Into the Sky is the seventh studio album of the South Korean pop music group g.o.d. Released in October 2005, it was their second release as a quartet following the departure of Yoon Kye-sang as well as their last before going on a nine-year hiatus. The remaining four members all went their separate ways after performing at their last concert in December that year and g.o.d would not officially reunite as a quintet until 2014.

Track listing
All lyrics and music is written and composed by Park Jin-young, except where noted.

Awards and nominations
The title track and promoted song "2♡" (pronounced "Two Love") won first place on Inkigayo and Music Camp (the former incarnation of Show! Music Core) and it was last song for which g.o.d won #1 on a music program.

Charts and sales

Monthly charts

Year-end charts

Sales

See also
JYP Entertainment discography

References

External links
Album Information – Mnet 

2005 albums
G.o.d albums
JYP Entertainment albums
Korean-language albums